Akele Hum Akele Tum (I'm Alone, You Are Alone) is a 1995 Indian Hindi-language romantic drama film starring Aamir Khan, Manisha Koirala and Master Adil, and directed by Mansoor Khan. The music is by Anu Malik and the lyrics are by Majrooh Sultanpuri. The film is loosely based on the 1979 American film Kramer vs. Kramer. Both Aamir Khan and Manisha Koirala's performances were acclaimed; the latter also received a nomination under the Best Actress category at the 41st Filmfare Awards. Although the film was well received with critics, it did not connect with the audience.

Plot
 
Rohit Kumar (Aamir Khan) is an aspiring playback singer while Kiran (Manisha Koirala) is an ambitious classical singer-in-training. They meet, relate to each other's sentiments, fall in love and get married prematurely. When Kiran's parents oppose their marriage, they decide to lead a separate life.

However, after marriage, Kiran's ambitions take a back to her household responsibilities and looking after their son. Time fails to abate Kiran's frustration until she decides to leave Rohit and start a new life all over again. Now single, Rohit is forced to look after both his son and his own failing career. After some obvious teething troubles, Rohit succeeds in creating a separate world for himself and his son, Sunil.

Meanwhile, Kiran becomes a huge film star. She tries to reconcile with Rohit but as luck would have it, Rohit is a proud man and misinterprets her support as her pity and things become worse. A court case is eventually filed for the custody of Sunil.

Rohit faces a tough time preparing for the case as his financial position is not as sound as Kiran's. He sells his best songs at a very low price so that he can fight the custody battle. During the court battle, Kiran's lawyer Bhujbal (Paresh Rawal) uses every possible trick to show that Rohit does not deserve the custody of his child. He even uses the information that Rohit had told Kiran only because he felt that she had a right to know about her son's life against him. Rohit instructs his lawyer to fight the case honestly as he does not wish to hurt Kiran and her reputation. In the end, the court rules in favor of the mother and Kiran is given custody of the child. During this time, common friends of Rohit and Kiran try to explain to Kiran that Rohit had changed for the better and that he was now very much attached to his son. Kiran also realises that their son would never find happiness only with her. She tells Rohit that she will not take Sunil away and that she wants him to stay at his own home to which Rohit replies that this was Kiran's home as well. Kiran seemingly moves to get out of the house but then closes the door and smiles.

Rohit and Kiran hug each other and their son and the movie ends.

Cast
 Aamir Khan as Rohit Kumar
 Manisha Koirala as Kiran Kumar (Rohit's wife)
 Adil Rizvi as Sunil "Sonu" Kumar (Rohit and Kiran's son)
 Deven Verma as Kanhaiya
 Tanvi Azmi as Farida
 Rohini Hattangadi as Mrs. Dayal
 Paresh Rawal as Advocate Bhujbal
 Aanjjan Srivastav as Ram Dayal
 Rakesh Roshan as Paresh Kapoor
 Shafi Inamdar as Kaushik
 Satish Shah as Gulbadan Kumar
 Harish Patel as Amar
 Navneet Nishan as Sunita (Kiran's Friend)
 Neeraj Vora as Moolchand (Grocer)
 Mushtaq Khan as Mr. Bhatija (Rohit's Lawyer)
 Dinesh Hingoo as Jamshed, Hotel Owner 
 Shashi Kiran as Ravinder Kapoor
 Suresh Bhagwat as Prakash (Tailor)
 Razzak Khan as Babulal
 Hiralal as Hira Lal
 Viju Khote (actor playing role of an NRI)
 Ayesha Jhulka as award presenter
 Yunus Parvez as Mehra, Restaurant and Disco bar owner(uncredited)
 Ghanshyam (actor playing role to insult an NRI)
 Jennifer Winget as young girl

Music
The music is given by Anu Malik and the lyrics were penned by Majrooh Sultanpuri. Tracks like "Raja Ko Rani Se Pyaar Gaya", "Dil Mera Churaya Kyun", "Akele Hum Akele Tum" and "Dil Kehta Hai" became immensely popular. The song "Aisa Zakham Diya Hai" sampled the famous 70s psychedelic rock song "Child In Time", performed by the English rock band Deep Purple, while "Dil Mera Churaya Kyun" is inspired from "Last Christmas" by Wham!. In existence is an unreleased version of the soundtrack, 'Dil Mera Churaya Kyun', sung by Udit Narayan, but never made it to the original soundtrack nor motion picture.

Awards and nominations 
41st Filmfare Awards:
Nominated
 Best Film – Mansoor Khan
 Best Director – Mansoor Khan
 Best Actress – Manisha Koirala
 Best Supporting Actress – Tanvi Azmi
 Best Music Director – Anu Malik
 Best Lyricist – Majrooh Sultanpuri for "Raja Ko Rani Se"
 Best Male Playback Singer – Udit Narayan for "Raja Ko Rani Se"
 Best Female Playback Singer – Alka Yagnik for "Raja Ko Rani Se"

References

External links
 

1995 films
1990s Hindi-language films
Indian remakes of American films
Hindi remakes of English films
Films scored by Anu Malik
Hindi-language romance films